Serbia Broadband (branded as SBB; full legal name: Serbia Broadband - Srpske kablovske mreže d.o.o.) is a cable television and broadband internet service provider in Serbia. The SBB company operates as part of the United Group, leading media and telecommunication operator in Southeastern Europe. The company is based in the "Telepark" business complex in Belgrade, which includes data center covering 750 square meters of floor space and divided into 20 server halls and technical support areas.

As of 2020, SBB is the largest cable operator with a market share of 46%, the second largest Internet provider with a market share of 32.08%, and the second largest fixed-line telecommunication network, having share of 19.1%.

History

The Serbia Broadband company – SBB – was formed in 2002 through the merger of KDS d.o.o Kragujevac, Telefonija Belgrade cable system, Media Plus Novi Sad, YU VOD Nis and a number of small operators. 

In 2007, Serbia Broadband was acquired by Mid Europa Partners, which simultaneously purchased Telemach Slovenia followed by acquiring Telemach Bosnia and Herzegovina shortly afterwards, cable television and broadband internet providers in Slovenia and Bosnia and Herzegovina, respectively. Mid Europa then created United Group, a subsidiary to control its three new acquisitions in former Yugoslavia, with European Bank for Reconstruction and Development (EBRD) holding a minority stake in the newly created subsidiary. In the case of Serbia Broadband, the owners legally controlled it via the Amsterdam-based Adria Cable B.V.

In October 2013, an American private equity firm Kohlberg Kravis Roberts (KKR) purchased the majority stake in United Group from Mid Europa Partners for an enterprise valuation of 1.3 billion USD, thus gaining control of Serbia Broadband. Once the new owners took over, they began legally controlling Serbia Broadband through the Amsterdam-based Adria Serbia Holdco B.V.

In April 2015, SBB bought Serbian internet provider EUnet for an undisclosed amount. In April 2017, SBB bought Serbian cable operator IKOM. In November 2017, SBB acquired Serbian minor cable company Kabel Group 85.

In September 2018, a British private equity firm BC Partners began the process of acquisition of the majority stakes of United Group from KKR for an enterprise valuation of 2.6 billion euros. Upon finalizing the acquisition, BC partners will officially gain ownership of Serbia Broadband.

Services

Cable TV
When it was first launched, SBB offered cable TV services in seven cities. It doubled its market share through fast growth in 2003 and today provides television services in more than 30 cities and towns across Serbia.

SBB expanded its network which was developed using the highest technical standards and expanded its TV channel offer to more than 220 now, including 80 in HD. That offer includes the highest-quality and most credible TV programming from United Media – news, sports, movies, children’s TV, music, educational content among them N1, Nova S, Sport Klub, Pikaboo, Brainz and others.

The company also introduced the country's first 4K channel (Sport Klub) in October 2018. Furthermore, the operator added four multi-angle and multi-screen channels.

Development continued with the introduction of D3 services in 2007 bringing digital TV to users along with a richer offer of channels in HD with an electronic program guide.

In 2010, SBB started delivering managed services while holding a Cisco certificate.

EON - TV Platform 
SBB launched the EON app on September 5, 2017.

The EON Smart Box, the first regional solution to combine television with Android services and applications, was presented in October 2018, turning any TV into a Smart TV, followed by the EON Smart TV app which allowed SBB users to watch TV outside the SBB network on any Internet provider in Serbia on their mobile devices, computers or Smart TV.

SBB was the first in Serbia to offer binge watching for series such as My Father’s Killers and Balkan Shadows which broke all viewing records.

Early in June 2020, SBB and United Cloud (United Group’s Development Center) presented an upgraded version of the EON platform which introduced EON profiles to start the future of personalized TV in Serbia.

The EON platform won the CSI award in the Best Mobile TV Technology or Service at the IBC 2018 global electronic media and technology conference.

Total TV - Satellite TV 
In May 2006, SBB launched TotalTV, its DTH satellite television platform. Launching Total TV, company became the first digital and analogue cable operator to introduce digital television in the region.

Total TV, as it was named commercially, is intended for areas where building cable infrastructure is complicated. This type of service provides TV services through the Eutelsat 16A, Hot Bird and/or Astra satellites bringing 220 TV channels.

Internet 
Early in 2003, SBB became the first operator to offer broadband Internet to its clients.

The digitalization of Serbia was launched as part of a five year plan with an investment worth 300 million Euro. 

SBB also provides Internet access outside the homes of its clients both at home and abroad. The UNIFI app allows access to the largest WiFi network with more than 900,000 locations in the region and the UNIFI Travel app also access at more than 70 million locations across the world.

Fixed Telephony 
The company was the first in Serbia to offer digital fixed telephony services in 2012 and has a market share of 20.5% (2020), ranking it second among landline service operators in Serbia.

The UNIFON app allows SBB landline use on mobile phones, that is on five different devices. App users can redirect calls through their landline from wherever they are at home or abroad using any WiFi Internet access point. Calls to other UNIFON users are free of charge.

SBB Foundation 
The SBB Foundation was formed in 2015 with the aim of launching long-term projects to improve living conditions and quality of life and contribute to the development of a functional and responsible society in Serbia.

It focused from the start on raising awareness of the importance of protecting the environment, helping problems in financial difficulties across Serbia and supporting young people’s education.

Don’t litter. No Excuses! Campaign was launched to raise awareness of the importance of protecting the environment, with a concrete goal – a cleaner Serbia. To date, the Foundation has helped clean up more than 25 cities, handed out some 43,000 ecologically sound bags and donated 22 playgrounds for children. 

The Core (serbian: Jezgro) program has been implemented since the Foundation was set up and provides financial support to functional families on the verge of subsistence.

Scholarship “Professor Njegoš B. Šolak” is intended to support support environment where especially gifted students can continue their development in order to fulfill their own potentials. Celebrities have won money for health and social care and education institutions in the Play and Win (serbian: Igraj i pobedi) and Between Us (serbian: Među nama) shows on the Nova S channel. 

The SBB Foundation has provided aid to the University Children’s Hospital in Belgrade, the Children’s Shelter, Kragujevac Clinical Center, Association of Parents of Children with Cancer (Udruženje roditelja dece obolele od raka – NURDOR) and many others.

References

External links
 

Companies based in Belgrade
D.o.o. companies in Serbia
Telecommunications companies established in 2002
Telecommunications companies of Serbia
Serbian companies established in 2002
Cable television companies of Serbia
2007 mergers and acquisitions